Festival dalmatinskih klapa Omiš (Croatian for Omiš Festival of Dalmatian Klapa) is a music festival of klapa singing held annually in Omiš, Croatia. It has existed since 1966, and it is the most important klapa event.

References

External links

Music festivals in Croatia
Dalmatia
Recurring events established in 1966
Croatian folk music
Omiš
Music festivals in Yugoslavia